Gameday (or GameDay) may refer to:

 College GameDay (disambiguation), several shows produced by ESPN
 GameDay (software)
 Gameday Center, a planned 15-story residential condominium in Lexington, Kentucky